Ranchers-Cattlemen Action Legal Fund v. Sonny Perdue (No. 4:16-cv-00041-BMM) is a case in which plaintiffs allege that checkoff dollars are being used to support Canadian and Mexican beef. Checkoffs are mandatory contributions, from beef producers in this case, which are used for generic industry advertising and research.  

This case is distinguished from Ranchers-Cattlemen Action Legal Fund v. USDA (No. 2:17-cv-00223), a challenge to USDA rules that allow Mexican and Canadian beef to be labelled as domestic beef.

Facts and prior history
In 2016 the United States Department of Agriculture rescinded regulations requiring Mexican and Canadian beef be marked as imported. Checkoff advertising does not distinguish between domestic and imported beef.  Plaintiff disagrees with advertising that promotes imported beef to its detriment. It claims compelled speech in violation of the First Amendment.  This matter had been addressed by the Supreme Court of the United States in Johanns v. Livestock Marketing Association (2005).

Developments 

In June 2017, the court issued a preliminary injunction that stopped the Montana Beef Board from using beef producers' checkoff contributions for advertising, unless the producers approve in advance.  The decision hung on the distinction between commercial speech and government speech. Compelled commercial speech is a First Amendment violation. This is in contraposition to Johanns v. Livestock Marketing Association (2005).

In September 2017, the court stayed further proceedings until the Ninth District Court of Appeals rules on the USDA appeal.

 First Amendment Challenge to Beef Checkoff Program Dismissed On March 27, 2020

 Serial Legal Challenges to Federal Beef Checkoff Program Continue on September 11, 2020

 Federal Appeals Court Upholds Dismissal of R-CALF Beef Checkoff Challenge On July 27, 2021

References

Commodity checkoff programs
Speech
United States case law